This article details the international fixtures and results of the Philippines men's national floorball team.

2022

2021

2019

2017

2015

2014

External links 
 
 Philippines - Team Card at the IFF

National team, Men's results